is a 2016 Japanese drama film directed by Kōji Fukada. It was screened in the Un Certain Regard section at the 2016 Cannes Film Festival where it won the Jury Prize.

Plot
Toshio (Furutachi), his wife Akie (Tsutsui), and their daughter Hotaru (Shinokawa) live a banal existence. Toshio operates a machine shop in his garage when suddenly an old acquaintance of Toshio's, Yasaka (Asano) arrives to help out at the shop. Hotaru practices the harmonium but is obviously a novice. Yasaka had just been released from prison and so without a permanent place to stay, Toshio takes him in as an assistant. Yasaka bonds with Hotaru, helping her with her music, and being helpful around the shop and house. Yasaka reveals to Akie that he was imprisoned for eleven years as a result of murder, asks for forgiveness for not mentioning this earlier, and slowly Yasaka becomes a greater part of the family. Yasaka and Akie have some romantic feelings for each other, and Toshio becomes suspicious as the family goes on a river trip. The movie also reveals that Yasaka is bitter about taking the blame for the murder, which Toshio participated in.

Later when they return, when Toshio is out of the house, Yasaka oversteps his bounds trying to kiss Akie and she pushes him away.  After this he goes for a walk and sees Hotaru. Later, Toshio finds Hotaru, injured and unresponsive, with Yasaka standing over her. Yasaka stands, shouting Toshio's name repeatedly, but Toshio does not respond as he is preoccupied with his daughter. Yasaka then walks off and disappears.

Eight years later, Toshio hires a new assistant, Takashi (Taiga). Takashi was raised by a single mother and takes some interest in the now disabled and non-verbal Hotaru, sketching her. Akie has become extremely protective of her daughter. Takashi reveals separately to Toshio and Akie that he is the illegitimate son of Yasaka, that Yasaka was a member of the yakuza, and that he wanted to be employed by Toshio based on letters Yasaka sent to his mother before he disappeared. After Takashi stands too close to Hotaru, Akie kicks him out of the house. Akie confronts Toshio about his involvement in the murder. Later, Toshio receives a tip on the location of Yasaka, and Akie and Toshio take Takashi to kill him in front of his father. Takashi offers himself willingly, which is rejected by the pair. The tip is only of someone who looks similar to Yasaka and having reached her breaking point, Akie takes Hotaru to a bridge, where she jumps (pulling Hotaru with her). The film ends with Toshio trying to resuscitate Hotaru.

Cast
 Tadanobu Asano
 Mariko Tsutsui
 Kanji Furutachi
 Taiga
 Takahiro Miura
 Momone Shinokawa

Awards

References

External links
 

2016 films
2016 drama films
2010s Japanese-language films
Japanese drama films
Films about dysfunctional families
2010s Japanese films